Massachusetts's 12th congressional district is an obsolete district. It was eliminated as a result of the redistricting cycle after the 1980 Census. Its last location was in south-eastern Massachusetts and its last Congressman was Gerry Studds, who was redistricted into the tenth district.

Cities and towns in the district

1790s–1830s

1880s–1900s

1910s
Suffolk County: Boston Wards 13, 14, 15, 16, 17, 20, 24.

1920s
Boston (Wards 9, 10, 11, 12, 17, 18, 19, 20, 21).

1940s
Boston (Wards 6, 7, 8, 9, 11, 13, 14, 15, 16, 17).

1950s–1980s

List of members representing the district

Notes

References

 Congressional Biographical Directory of the United States 1774–present
 

12
Former congressional districts of the United States
1983 disestablishments in Massachusetts
Constituencies established in 1795
Constituencies disestablished in 1983
1795 establishments in Massachusetts